Aluminum Hormozgan F.C.  is an Iranian football club founded in 2006. The team is based in Bandar Abbas, Iran and compete in the Azadegan League. In 2012 they became the first club from Hormozgan to play in the Persian Gulf Pro League.

History
Aluminium Hormozgan was founded in 2006 and were promoted to the Iran Pro League in 2012 but were soon relegated to Azadegan League the following season after finishing 15th. They were the first team from the Province of Hormozgan to play in the Iran Pro League. Aluminium was relegated to the 2nd Division in 2016.

Season-by-season
The table below chronicles the achievements of Aluminium Hormozgan in various competitions since 2006.

First-team squad

For recent transfers, see List of Iranian football transfers summer 2015''.

Managers
 Javad Zarincheh (October 2009)
 Vinko Begović (October 2009 – June 2011)
 Akbar Misaghian (June 2011 – February 2013)
 Parviz Mazloomi (February 2013 – September 2013)
 Abbas Sarkhab (September 2013 – November 2013)
 Hans-Jürgen Gede (November 2013 – January 2014)
 Majid Namjoo-Motlagh (January 2014 –Aug 2015)
 Davood Haghdost (Aug 2015–)

References

External links
 Aluminium Hormozgan

Football clubs in Iran
Association football clubs established in 2006
2006 establishments in Iran
Sport in Bandar Abbas